Drago Šoštarić (born 30 January 1943) is a Slovenian gymnast. He competed in eight events at the 1972 Summer Olympics.

References

1943 births
Living people
Slovenian male artistic gymnasts
Olympic gymnasts of Yugoslavia
Gymnasts at the 1972 Summer Olympics
Sportspeople from Maribor